INPI may refer to:

 National Institute of Industrial Property (France) (Institut national de la propriété industrielle)
 National Industrial Property Institute (Portugal) (Instituto nacional da propriedade industrial)

 National Institute of Indigenous Peoples in Mexico (Instituto Nacional de los Pueblos Indígenas)

See also
 Mexican Institute of Industrial Property (Instituto Mexicano de la Propiedad Industrial) (IMPI)
 Intellectual Property Office (disambiguation)
 Intellectual property organization
 Patent office

Intellectual property organizations